Under the Stadium Lights is a 2021 sports drama film directed by Todd Randall and starring Milo Gibson and Laurence Fishburne. It is based on the nonfiction book Brother's Keeper by Al Pickett and Chad Mitchell. The film follows the players, coach, and team chaplain of a high school football team in Abilene, Texas.

It was released in select theaters and on video on demand in the United States on June 4, 2021 by Saban Films.

Cast
Laurence Fishburne as Harold Christian, who was somewhat of a local celebrity in Abilene and owned a restaurant (Harold's BBQ) which fed the players each Thursday night during the season.
Milo Gibson as Chad Mitchell, the team chaplain and author of the novel this film is based on.
Abigail Hawk as Ashley Mitchell, Chad's wife.
Adrian Favela as Anthony Carriola
Carter Redwood as Ronnell Sims
Acoryé White as Herschel Sims
Germain Arroyo as Augustine Barrientes
Glenn Morshower as Steve Warren
Noel Gugliemi as Albert
Eddie George as Ronnell Sims Sr.
Bucky Covington
Ava Justin as Patron
Gwen Ruhoff as Patron
Bruce Purcell as Patron

Production
Principal photography wrapped before the COVID-19 pandemic and the film is now in post-production. Production began in Minnesota in 2018 and wrapped up filming in Abilene, Texas in early 2019. While shooting in Abilene the crew filmed at popular local destinations such as Abilene Zoological Gardens, Paramount Theatre, Abilene High School, and Shotwell Stadium.

Release
In November 2020, Saban Films acquired North American and U.K. rights to the film and renamed Under the Stadium Lights. It was released in select theaters and on digital June 4, 2021. It was released on DVD on August 3, 2021.

Reception
The film has a 12% rating on Rotten Tomatoes based on seventeen reviews.

Alan Ng of Film Threat rated the film a 7 out of 10.

Nell Minow of RogerEbert.com awarded the film two stars.

Ty Burr of The Boston Globe awarded the film one star.

References

External links
 

2021 films
2021 drama films
American sports drama films
Films based on non-fiction books
Sports films based on actual events
Saban Films films
Films set in Texas
Sports in Abilene, Texas
Films shot in Texas
Films shot in Minnesota
2020s English-language films
2020s American films